The VA New York Harbor Healthcare System is a set of hospitals run by the United States Department of Veterans Affairs in the New York City area. It comprises three medical centers, two community outpatient clinics, and five veterans centers. The system is a component of the much larger VA Health Care Network.

Locations 
The New York Harbor Healthcare System has five major locations across four of the five boroughs of New York:
 Brooklyn Campus, located at 800 Poly Place
 Manhattan Campus, located at 423 East 23rd Street
 St. Albans Community Living Center, located at 179-00 Linden Boulevard in Queens
 Harlem Community Clinic, located at 55 West 125th Street in Manhattan
 Staten Island Community Clinic, located at 1150 South Avenue

References

External links 
 Official site

Hospital networks in the United States
Veterans Affairs medical facilities
Medical and health organizations based in New York City